Abudhok Ayang Kur is a South Sudanese politician and the current governor of Upper Nile. Ayang is a Shilluk. In 2015, Ayang was appointed as the deputy governor of the Fashoda State  His sworning in, witnessed shooting and killing of civilians who came out of POC  upon his arrival to Malakal.

References 

Living people
Politicians of African nations
South Sudanese political people
Year of birth missing (living people)